Sir Christopher Leslie George Mallaby  (7 July 1936 – 28 February 2022) was a British diplomat.

Early life and career
The son of Brigadier A. W. S. Mallaby CIE OBE and Margaret Catherine Mallaby (née Jones), he was educated at Eton College and studied Modern Languages and History at King's College, Cambridge. In 1971 he studied at Harvard Business School. After leaving university he entered Her Majesty's Diplomatic Service in 1959.

Mallaby was British Ambassador to West Germany 1988-1992, British Ambassador to France 1993-1996 and Managing Director of UBS Investment Bank.

Mallaby was chairman of Somerset House Trust from 2002–2006, and trustee of the Tate Gallery Group 1996-2002. He was also as of 2011 a trustee director and deputy-chairman of Reuters, and since 2001 has been the Chairman of EORTC.

Mallaby was appointed Companion of the Order of St Michael and St George in 1982, Knight Commander of the Order of St Michael and St George in 1986, Knight Grand Cross of the Order of St Michael and St George in 1996 and Knight Grand Cross of the Royal Victorian Order in 1992.

In an interview in 2009, when asked how bad the relationship between the Prime Minister of the United Kingdom Margaret Thatcher and Chancellor of Germany Helmut Kohl was, Mallaby replied, "Very bad. It was about personal chemistry. They didn't naturally enjoy each other's company. Mrs Thatcher had easier relationships with Reagan or Gorbachev."

Mallaby initiated the Entente Cordiale Scholarship scheme, a prestigious Franco-British scholarship programme.

Personal life
In 1961 Mallaby married Pascale Thierry-Mieg, and they had a son, Sebastian, and three daughters. Lady Mallaby died on 11 February 2020. Christopher Mallaby died on 28 February 2022, at the age of 85.

References

External links
Interview with Sir Christopher Leslie George Mallaby & transcript, British Diplomatic Oral History Programme, Churchill College, Cambridge, 1997

|-

1936 births
2022 deaths
Alumni of King's College, Cambridge
Ambassadors of the United Kingdom to France
Ambassadors of the United Kingdom to Germany
Knights Grand Cross of the Order of St Michael and St George
Knights Grand Cross of the Royal Victorian Order
Christopher
People educated at Eton College
Ambassadors of the United Kingdom to West Germany